Rutland station is a train station in Rutland, Vermont served by Amtrak, the national railroad passenger system.  It is served by the single daily round trip of the Amtrak Ethan Allen Express. The station has a single low-level side platform, with a short high-level section for accessible level boarding.

History

Rutland's first railway station was built near Merchants' Row in 1853-54 by the Rutland Railroad. In 1905-06 wings were added to the north and south of the depot. Passenger service west of Whitehall and Eagle Bridge ended on June 24, 1934. The building served the city of Rutland until New York City to Montreal passenger service ended in 1953 (the Rutland RR's Green Mountain Flyer and Mount Royal), and two years later it was demolished.

Amtrak service to Rutland commenced on December 2, 1996 with service provided to a temporary station platform. The station, which is located near the former Rutland Railroad yard on the western edge of downtown, opened in 1999. Designed by local firm NBF Architects, the station has walls of red brick that rise from a base of textured gray concrete block. To celebrate Rutland native Jim Jeffords, who represented Vermont in Congress, city leaders renamed the station the “James M. Jeffords Rail Passenger Welcome Center.” 

From March 2020 to July 19, 2021, all Amtrak service in Vermont was suspended in response to the COVID-19 pandemic, with the Ethan Allen Express truncated to Albany–Rensselaer station.

References

External links

Amtrak stations in Vermont
Buildings and structures in Rutland, Vermont
Transportation buildings and structures in Rutland County, Vermont
Railway stations in the United States opened in 1999
Former Rutland Railroad stations